António de Serpa Pimentel (1825 in Coimbra – 1900) was Prime Minister of Portugal from 14 January to 11 October 1890. His term in office began as a reaction to the British ultimatum concerning Portuguese colonial policy in southeast Africa. The signing of the Anglo-Portuguese Treaty later that year, which was intended as a step to resolve the crisis, was viewed as further appeasement of a powerful Britain.  This led to his resignation and the fall of his government.

References 

1825 births
1900 deaths
People from Coimbra
Regenerator Party politicians
Prime Ministers of Portugal
Finance ministers of Portugal
19th-century Portuguese people